

Kingdom of Serbs, Croats and Slovenes

Creation of Yugoslavia

1927
 September 11: 1927 Kingdom of Serbs, Croats and Slovenes parliamentary election

1928
June 20: Representative Puniša Račić of the People's Radical Party shot Đuro Basariček, Pavle Radić, Ivan Pernar, Ivan Granđa and Croatian Peasant Party leader Stjepan Radić in the National Assembly. Basariček and Pavle Radić died at the scene, Pernar and Granđa were only wounded, and Stjepan Radić was mortally wounded.
July 28: Anton Korošec of the Slovene People's Party became the first non-Serb prime minister of the kingdom. 
August 1: National Assembly reconvened, with representatives of the Peasant-Democrat Coalition boycotting it.
August 8: Stjepan Radić died from wounds suffered in the attack in the assembly chambers.
August 12: Funeral of Stjepan Radić.
August 13: Vladko Maček elected president of Croatian Peasant Party.

Kingdom of Yugoslavia

1929
January 6: King Alexander abolished the Constitution, prorogued the National Assembly and introduced a personal dictatorship (6 January Dictatorship)
January 7: General Petar Živković became prime minister, heading the regime's Yugoslav Radical Peasants' Democracy.
January 11: State Court for the Protection of the State was established in Belgrade. Croatian activist Branimir Jelić leaves the country for Austria. 
April 20: The Sophia Declaration was released by the Ustaša - Croatian Revolutionary Movement and the Internal Macedonian Revolutionary Organization calling for the independence of Croatia and Macedonia.
April 25: Đuro Đaković, a prominent Trade unions' activist in Yugoslavia and the First secretary of the Communist Party of Yugoslavia, was murdered by Yugoslav policemen at the Yugoslav-Austrian boundary in the present-day Slovenia, after four days of torturing and questioning in Zagreb police station.
October 3: The Kingdom of Serbs, Croats and Slovenes was renamed to the Kingdom of Yugoslavia. The state was also divided into new administrative divisions called banovine (singular banovina).
December 22: Vladko Maček arrested.

1930
January 25: August Košutić and Juraj Krnjević of the Croatian Peasant Party delivered a memorandum to the League of Nations outlining the struggles of the Croats in the Kingdom of Yugoslavia.
June 14: Vladko Maček acquitted and released.

1931
February 18: Writer Milan Šufflay is murdered by Yugoslav nationalists in Zagreb. 
September 3: A new 1931 Yugoslav Constitution was put in place to replace the one from 1921 (abolished in 1929).
November 8: Elections held in which only one electoral list, headed by General Živković is on the ballot.

1932
June 7: Yugoslav nationalists attempt to assassinate writer Mile Budak.
September 6: Members of the Ustaša - Croatian Revolutionary Movement attempted to launch a revolution on Velebit. 
November 7: Peasant-Democrat Coalition released the Zagreb Points, which outlined the coalition's plan for a return to parliamentary democracy.

1933
Svetozar Pribićević published Diktatura kralja Aleksandra (The Dictatorship of King Alexander) in exile in Prague.
January: Sarajevo Points published by the Yugoslav Muslim Organization. The party's leader Mehmed Spaho was sentenced to twenty days in jail because of the document.
January 31: Vladko Maček arrested in relation with the Zagreb Points. 
April 29: Vladko Maček sentenced to three years in jail. 
July 14: Josip Predavec, vice-president of the Croatian Peasant Party, was killed in Dugo Selo.

1934

February 9: Balkan Pact was signed by the Kingdom of Yugoslavia, Greece, Romania and Turkey. 
October 9: King Alexander was killed in Marseille by Vlado Chernozemski of the IMRO in cooperation with Croatian Ustaše.
December 22: Vladko Maček released from jail.

World War II

FPR Yugoslavia

SFR Yugoslavia

See also
Timeline of the breakup of Yugoslavia

References

History of Yugoslavia
Yugoslavia